The Billboard Tropical Albums chart, published in Billboard magazine, is a record chart that features Latin music sales information in regard to tropical music. The data is compiled by Nielsen SoundScan from a sample that includes music stores, music departments at electronics and department stores, Internet sales (both physical and digital) and verifiable sales from concert venues in the United States.

Number one albums
Key
 – Best-selling Tropical album of the year

References
General

 For information about every week of this chart, follow this link; in the chart date section select a date and the top ten positions for the week selected will appear on screen, including the number-one album, which is shown in the table above.

Specific

Tropical 2010s
United States Tropical Albums
2010s in Latin music
Tropical music albums